Since the 2007 municipal reform, Social Democrats had had an elected mayor of Aalborg Municipality. In the previous election, they won 17 seats, which was an absolute majority. But the Social Democrats lost 11.8% of their vote for this election, and lost 5 seats, while 3 other parties from the traditional Red Bloc saw an increase in their vote share. This was a trend, that was seen in the 4 largest municipalities of Denmark.
It was later announced that Thomas Kastrup-Larsen would continue as mayor for a third term.

Electoral system
For elections to Danish municipalities, a number varying from 9 to 31 are chosen to be elected to the municipal council. The seats are then allocated using the D'Hondt method and a closed list proportional representation.
Aalborg Municipality had 31 seats in 2021

Unlike in Danish General Elections, in elections to municipal councils, electoral alliances are allowed.

Electoral alliances  
{{Small|Source''}}Electoral Alliance 1Electoral Alliance 2Electoral Alliance 3Electoral Alliance 4'''

Results

Notes

References 

Aalborg